The 2012 Midlothian Council election took place on 3 May 2012 to elect members of Midlothian Council. The election used the six wards created as a result of the Local Governance (Scotland) Act 2004, with each ward electing three or four Councillors using the single transferable vote system form of proportional representation, with 18 Councillors being elected.

The election saw Labour retain their traditional position as the largest party on the council though they lost compared to the 2007 election. The Scottish National Party significantly increased their representation with 2 net gains and a significant rise in vote share to have the same seat numbers as the Labour Party. The Scottish Green Party gained a seat on the council for the first time and so too did Independent, former Conservative member, Peter de Vink. The Scottish Liberal Democrats were wiped out from this authority as well, losing all 3 of their seats (2 in the election, 1 by the defection of a member after 2007).

Following the election the SNP formed a minority administration with the support of the Green Party and the Independent. This is the first time that Labour had not had a role in the running of Midlothian in 84 years.

Election result

Note: "Votes" are the first preference votes. The net gain/loss and percentage changes relate to the result of the previous Scottish local elections on 3 May 2007. This may differ from other published sources showing gain/loss relative to seats held at dissolution of Scotland's councils.

Ward results

Penicuik
2007: 1xSNP; 1xLab; 1xLib Dem
2012: 2xSNP; 1xLab
2007-2012: SNP gain one seat from Lib Dem

Bonnyrigg
2007: 2xLab; 1xSNP
2012: 1xLab; 1xSNP; 1xGRN
2007-2012 Change: GRN gain one seat from Lab

Dalkeith
2007: 2xLab; 1xSNP
2012: 2xLab; 1xSNP
2007-2012 Change: No change

Midlothian West
2007: 1xSNP; 1xLab; 1xLib Dem
2012: 2xSNP; 1xLab
2007-2012 Change: SNP gain one seat from Lib Dem

Midlothian East
2007: 1xSNP; 1xLab; 1xLib Dem
2012: 1xSNP; 1xLab; 1xIndependent
2007-2012 Change: Independent gain one seat from Labour

Midlothian South
2007: 2xLab; 1xSNP
2012: 2xLab; 1xSNP
2007-2012 Change: No change

Post-Election Changes
† Midlothian East Independent and former Labour Cllr Peter Boyes resigned due to ill-health on 11 August 2014. A by-election was held on 27 November 2014 and was won by Labour's Kenny Young. 
†† Midlothian West SNP Cllr Owen Thompson was elected as an MP for Midlothian on 7 May 2015. He resigned as Leader of Midlothian Council on 23 June 2015 and announced he would resign his Council seat with effect from 1 July 2015. A by-election was held to fill the vacancy on 10 September 2015 and the seat was held by the SNP's Kelly Parry.

By-elections

References 

2012
2012 Scottish local elections